VVV-Venlo  is a Dutch women's football from Venlo. The team was founded in 2010, starting in the Eredivisie season 2010/11. The club is working together with SV Venray who is playing in the Hoofdklasse.

Since 2011 VVV is working together with a German club FCR 2001 Duisburg.

VVV-Venlo decided to stop playing in the Vrouwen Eredivisie/BeNe League. Owing to the number of qualitative good female players in the Netherlands they foresee a team with insufficient quality. All the players shall return in the competition in the newly formed team of FCE/PSV in the new season.

Results Eredivisie

Current squad
As of 29 November 2011. After this season the team stopped. This was the squad in their final season.

Source: nl.women.soccerway.com

Head coaches
  Rick de Rooij (2010–2012)

Former players

References

Women
Women's football clubs in the Netherlands
BeNe League teams
Eredivisie (women) teams
Association football clubs established in 2010
Association football clubs disestablished in 2012
2010 establishments in the Netherlands
2012 disestablishments in the Netherlands
Football clubs in Limburg (Netherlands)